Group D of the EuroBasket 2013 took place between 4 and 9 September 2013. The group played all of its games at the Arena Bonifika in Koper, Slovenia.

The group composed of Finland, Greece, Italy, Russia, Sweden and Turkey. The three best ranked teams advanced to the second round.

Standings
|}

All times are local (UTC+2)

4 September

Turkey vs. Finland

Sweden vs. Greece

Russia vs. Italy

5 September

Finland vs. Sweden

Italy vs. Turkey

Greece vs. Russia

7 September

Russia vs. Sweden

Italy vs. Finland

Turkey vs. Greece

8 September

Finland vs. Russia

Greece vs. Italy

Sweden vs. Turkey

9 September

Greece vs. Finland

Italy vs. Sweden

Turkey vs. Russia

External links
Standings and fixtures

Group D
2013–14 in Italian basketball
2013–14 in Greek basketball
2013–14 in Russian basketball
2013–14 in Turkish basketball
2013 in Swedish sport
2013 in Finnish sport